The Khvalisy were a tribe mentioned in old Russian chronicles. 

Polish historian  conjectured that Khvalisy referred to the same people called "Khalyzians" by the Byzantine chroniclers.

Other scholars  believe that "Khvalisy" refers to Khazaran, the twin city of Atil, (the capital of the Khazar Khaganate) and that the term derives from the Khwarazmians who formed a part of the Khazar army (see Arsiyah).

See also
Khvalynsk - a Russian town whose name may derive from the same root

References

Karpov, A. J.: "Genealogija chvalisov i bolgar v letopisnoj stat'e 1096 g." Archiv russkoj istorii. Vypusk 4, 1994. - 7-26
Omeljan Pritsak, "An Arabic Text on the Trade Route of the Corporation of Ar-Rus in the Second Half of the Ninth Century," Folia Orientalia 12 (1970): 257).

Khazars